Nelson Harold Morgan (born May, 1949) is an American computer scientist and professor in residence (emeritus) of electrical engineering and computer science at the University of California, Berkeley. Morgan is the co-inventor of the Relative Spectral (RASTA) approach to speech signal processing, first described in a technical report published in 1991.

Education and career 
Morgan was born in Buffalo, New York. He studied at University of Chicago, later he received his PhD as an NSF fellow from University of California, Berkeley in 1980 under the supervision of Robert W. Brodersen. Morgan worked at National Semiconductor before taking up the post as a professor in residence at University of California, Berkeley. At Berkeley, he founded ICSI's Realization Group, which later become known as the Speech Group, in 1988. He served as director of ICSI from 1999 through 2011.

Research and contributions 
In 1993, Morgan and Herve Bourlard published their work on the hybrid system approach to speech recognition, which uses neural networks probabilistically with Hidden Markov Models (HMMs). The system improved automatic speech recognition techniques based on HMMs by providing discriminative training, incorporating multiple input sources, and using a flexible architecture able to accommodate contextual inputs and feedbacks. The work has been described as "seminal.". Morgan won the 1996 IEEE Signal Processing Magazine Best Paper Award for a paper with Bourlard. Morgan and Bourlard were awarded the 2022 IEEE James L. Flanagan Speech and Audio Processing Award "For contributions to neural networks for statistical speech recognition."

Morgan was the principal investigator of the IARPA-funded project Outing Unfortunate Characteristics of HMMs, which sought to identify problems in automatic speech recognition technology. He also led a team of universities to build speech recognition systems for low resource languages as part of the IARPA Babel program.

Morgan was the former director of the International Computer Science Institute (ICSI), where he was also the Speech Group leader. He recently has focused on campaign reform through empowering volunteerism. In that work, he co-founded UpRise Campaigns with Antonia Scatton, and later co-founded Neighbors Forward AZ with Alison Porter.

Morgan has produced more than 200 publications, including four books,

Honors and awards 
Morgan is a fellow of the IEEE and the International Speech Communication Association. He was on the editorial board of Speech Communication Magazine, of which he is a former co-editor-in-chief.

References 

Living people
American computer scientists
Fellow Members of the IEEE
1949 births
People from Buffalo, New York
University of Chicago alumni
University of California, Berkeley alumni
University of California, Berkeley faculty